Jacques Clarion (12 October 1779 in Saint-Pons, Alpes-de-Haute-Provence – 28 September 1844 in Garches) was a French physician, pharmacist and botanist.

In his youth, he served as an apprentice-pharmacist in the town of Seyne, while in the meantime studying plants native to the Alps. Up until 1799, he performed military service as a pharmacist third-class in Italy. He later studied medicine in Paris, and in 1805 began work as a pharmacist in the service of Emperor Napoleon. In this role, he served as director of the pharmacy at the Palace Saint-Cloud, a position he maintained during the reigns of Louis XVIII and Charles X.

In 1819 he became an assistant professor at the Ecole de Pharmacie de Paris, and in 1825 a professor of botany. From 1822 to 1830 he was a member of the Académie de Médecine.

In 1812, the botanical genus Clarionea (Lagasca ex A. P. de Candolle, 1812) was named in his honor.

Published works 
 Observations sur l'analyse des végétaux suivies d'un travail chimique sur les rhubarbe exotique et indigène, 1803 - Comments on botanical analysis, followed by chemical studies of exotic and native rhubarb.
 Abrégé de médecine pratique, ou Manuel médical d'après les principes de la doctrine physiologique, 1832 -  Medical manual on principles of physiological doctrine.
 Nouveau Précis des maladies des enfans fondé sur la doctrine, 1833 - On childhood diseases based on physiological doctrine.

References
 "This article incorporates translated text based from an equivalent article at the French Wikipedia, source listed as: Amédée Dechambre (1875). Dictionnaire encyclopédique des sciences médicales, tome dix-septième. G. Masson (Paris).

1779 births
1844 deaths
People from Alpes-de-Haute-Provence
French pharmacists
19th-century French botanists